1651 Behrens, provisional designation , is a stony Florian asteroid from the inner regions of the asteroid belt, approximately 10 kilometers in diameter. Discovered by  Marguerite Laugier in 1936, it was named after Johann Behrens.

Discovery 

Behrens was discovered on 23 April 1936, by French astronomer Marguerite Laugier at Nice Observatory in southeastern France. It was independently discovered by Karl Reinmuth at Heidelberg Observatory, Germany in the following month.

Classification and orbit 

Behrens is an S-type asteroid and member of the Flora family, a large group of stony asteroids in the inner main-belt. It orbits the Sun at a distance of 2.0–2.3 AU once every 3 years and 3 months (1,175 days). Its orbit has an eccentricity of 0.07 and an inclination of 5° with respect to the ecliptic. As no precoveries were taken, and no prior identifications were made, the body's observation arc begins with its official discovery observation.

Physical characteristics

Rotation period 

Astronomers Laurent Bernasconi and Stéphane Charbonnel obtained a rotational lightcurve of Behrens from photometric observations made in August 2001. It gave a longer than average rotation period of 34.34 hours with a brightness variation of 0.16 magnitude.

Diameter and albedo 

According to the survey carried out by NASA's Wide-field Infrared Survey Explorer with its subsequent NEOWISE mission, Behrens measures between 8.96 and 10.33 kilometers in diameter, and its surface has an albedo between 0.20 and 0.318. The Collaborative Asteroid Lightcurve Link assumes an albedo of 0.24 – derived from 8 Flora, the largest member and namesake of this orbital family – and calculates a diameter of 10.31 kilometers with an absolute magnitude of 12.1.

Naming 

Based on a proposal by Otto Kippes, who verified the discovery, this minor planet was named after Johann Gerhard Behrens (1889–1978), German amateur astronomer and pastor at Detern, in lower Saxony. He was known for his orbit computations on comets and minor planets. The official naming citation was published by the Minor Planet Center on 1 October 1980.

References

External links 
 Asteroid Lightcurve Database (LCDB), query form (info )
 Dictionary of Minor Planet Names, Google books
 Asteroids and comets rotation curves, CdR – Observatoire de Genève, Raoul Behrend
 Discovery Circumstances: Numbered Minor Planets (1)-(5000) – Minor Planet Center
 
 

001651
Discoveries by Marguerite Laugier
Named minor planets
19360423